Cirsonella floridensis is a species of sea snail, a marine gastropod mollusk in the family Skeneidae.

References

External links
 To World Register of Marine Species

floridensis
Gastropods described in 1927